Pianosaurus was a 1980s rock and roll band from New York City, formed by Alex Garvin, Steve Dansiger, and Bianca Miller. Their music was played on toy instruments, the name being taken from a child's plastic toy piano in the shape of a dinosaur with a keyboard running along the right side.

After two self-released live albums, their 'debut' album Groovy Neighborhood was released by Rounder Records in 1987. Produced by  Peter Holsapple, guitarist and songwriter for The dB's, "Neighborhood" featured cover versions of Chuck Berry's "Memphis", as well as the Box Tops' 1960s hit "The Letter".

In 1989, the song "Back to School" was featured in the movie New York Stories, in Francis Ford Coppola's short "Life without Zoe", and was released on the soundtrack.

Their second album, titled Back to School, remains unreleased.

References

External links
[ AMG entry for Pianosaurus]

Rock music groups from New York (state)
Musical groups from New York City